The Wisbech Town Council elections were held the same time as the 2015 United Kingdom local elections. It used the new boundaries from The Fenland (Electoral Changes) Order 2014

A Ward results 

Key 
 = sitting councillor

, References

2015 English local elections
May 2015 events in the United Kingdom
2010s in Cambridgeshire